SCCP may refer to:

 Sabah Chinese Consolidated Party, a defunct political party from state of Sabah, Malaysia 
 The Scientific Committee on Consumer Products of the European Commission's Directorate-General for Health and Consumer Protection
 Skinny Client Control Protocol, a VoIP terminal control protocol defined by Cisco Systems, Inc.
 Signalling Connection Control Part, from ITU-T recommendation Q.713, is the network protocol for Signalling System 7 networks.
 South Carolina College of Pharmacy.
 Sparse conditional constant propagation, an optimisation technique used in compilers.
 Sport Club Corinthians Paulista
 Short-chained chlorinated paraffins